The words Tredecimal, Tridecimal and Triskadecimal (i.e., pertaining to 13) may specifically refer to

 Base 13 number system
 Limit (music), 13-limit tuning and intervals
A type of neutral third music interval